Diplacodes lefebvrii is a species of dragonfly in the family Libellulidae known commonly as the black percher or black ground skimmer. It is a common species native to most all of Africa and southern Eurasia. It can be found in almost any type of freshwater habitat.

Description and habitat
It is a small dragonfly with eyes dark brown above, violaceous below. Its prothorax, thorax, abdomen, and legs are entirely black in full adults; but in sub-adults, some yellow marks on sides of thorax and yellow spots on segments 4 to 8 in abdomen.

This species is found on open waste lands and freshwater habitats.

See also 
 List of odonates of Sri Lanka
 List of odonates of India
 List of odonata of Kerala

References

External links

Libellulidae
Taxa named by Jules Pierre Rambur
Insects described in 1842
Taxonomy articles created by Polbot